Donna Lynn Awatere Huata (sometimes written Awatere-Huata, previously known as Donna Awatere; born 1949) is a former member of the New Zealand Parliament for the ACT New Zealand Party and activist for Māori causes.

Early life

Donna Awatere was born in Rotorua in 1949, and was educated in Auckland. Her primary area of study was education, particularly educational psychology, but she has also undertaken study in operatic singing and film production.

Her father, Colonel Arapeta Awatere DSO MC, was a prominent member of the Māori Battalion who was later elected to the Auckland City Council. In 1969 he was convicted of the murder of his mistress's lover and sent to jail, where he eventually died.

Activism

From the 1970s Awatere became involved in the Māori protest movement, including the group Ngā Tamatoa. She was a leading protester against the 1981 Springbok Tour, and in 1984 she published Maori Sovereignty, which became a key text in the Māori protest movement. During this period she and fellow Maori activist Ripeka Evans went to Communist Cuba.  She was also involved in feminist politics, and Maori Sovereignty was originally written for the feminist magazine Broadsheet. She was critical of white feminists who ignored issues of race, and expressed the opinion that the problems facing Māori were more important than those facing women and other marginalised groups. In Maori Sovereignty she is generally critical of the established left.

After the publication of Maori Sovereignty, Awatere retired from protest and became a biculturalism consultant for various organisations, including the New Zealand Treasury and the New Zealand Police. She also imported a children's reading programme, which she later developed and promoted through the Pipi Foundation. During this period she married Wi Huata and changed her surname from Awatere to Awatere Huata.

Member of Parliament

Member of Parliament

This surprised many commentators, as ACT was not generally associated with the sort of cause that Awatere Huata had previously supported. In a 2019 interview on Māori Television's current affairs program Te Ao with Moana, Awatere Huata claimed she joined ACT as she supported its educational policy of the funding following the child, as she believed this would make it easier to establish Kura Kaupapa and Kohanga Reo. She described herself as being at the time too "economically naïve to understand [ACT's agenda] was a neoliberal agenda," and said once discovering this she resolved to stay within parliament and "fight from within". In the interview she described going with ACT as being "one step too far".

Awatere Huata was ranked in fourth place on ACT's party list, and stood as a candidate in the Māori electorate of Te Puku O Te Whenua, coming in 4th place. She was not successful in her electorate race, but entered Parliament as a list MP.

Pipi Foundation Affair

In 2003 Awatere Huata was expelled from the ACT party on allegations of fraud regarding the Pipi Foundation charity, which at the time was under investigation by the Serious Fraud Office. Subsequently, there were a series of legal battles around Awatere Huata's right to remain in parliament as an independent list MP. These culminated in one of the Supreme Court's first major decisions in 2004 and she was removed from Parliament, giving the ACT Party a new MP, Kenneth Wang until the 2005 New Zealand election.

Awatere Huata was charged by the Serious Fraud Office and later convicted of fraud after taking $80,000 from the Pipi Foundation, a Government funded charity, she had set up as an MP in 1999. The media reported that "Some of the stolen money was used to pay for Awatere Huata's stomach stapling operation and some was used to pay state-integrated school fees for the couple's children." On 30 September 2005, she was sentenced to 2 years 9 months in jail alongside her husband, Wi Huata, who received 2 years with the ability to apply for home detention. On 16 May 2006, she was released on home detention and after her sentence was completed in  February 2009, she was able to set up a correspondence teaching centre "The Learning Post". In October 2010 another school she and her husband ran  was forced to go into liquidation owing large sums of money. NZQA said that many of the courses were inadequately supported. The school had only 15 pupils.

In a 2019 interview with Moana Maniapoto Awatere Huata stated "I am proud of the fact that because of the issues that erupted around me that led to me being expelled from parliament, I actually helped bring down ACT. And that, to me, is a big achievement."

After Parliament
Awatere Huata worked briefly in several roles for New Zealand Māori Council, including administrative support and representing the council at the United Nations Permanent Forum on Indigenous Issues. This was followed by a role under Mark Solomon at the Māori Carbon Foundation.  

In mid-March 2022, Awatere Huata and her husband Wi Huata were ordered to vacate their home and farm on disputed land in Maraekakaho near Hastings. Justice Christine Grice ruled in favour of the Te Hua Whenua Trust's trustees, who disputed the Huata's lease of the land for the past 35 years. This decision reversed a Maori Land Court ruling and is now being appealed.

Notes

References

Published works

Awatere Huata's contribution is a paper entitled: "Common sense in education."

Awatere Huata's contribution is a paper entitled: "Maori client needs of the future."

Awatere Huata's contribution is a paper entitled: "Kiwi myth or New Zealand dream?"

As part of this Television New Zealand Maori programme (made at the Kokohinau Marae near Te Teko), Awatere Huata was interviewed about her book, My journey  (for details of the book, see below)

This is another iteration of the Ashley Heenan recording listed below.

The first three parts of this book were originally published in the New Zealand feminist magazine, Broadsheet. 

"This paper was prepared for the Public Service in a Multicultural Society conference, State Services Commission, March 1982" (p.4).

Awatere's contribution is a paper entitled: "Maori Land March, 1975."

 Awatere Huata (and five other women) was initially interviewed in 1976 for a documentary series: this production is an update on her (and their) life and times.

Awatere's contribution is as one of the vocal soloists on the sixth track.

Awatere Huata's contribution is a paper entitled: "Walking on eggs." This volume has an introduction by Dale Spender.

1949 births
Living people
ACT New Zealand MPs
New Zealand Māori feminists
People from Rotorua
New Zealand prisoners and detainees
Māori MPs
Māori activists
New Zealand list MPs
New Zealand politicians convicted of fraud
Māori politicians
Members of the New Zealand House of Representatives
People expelled from public office
New Zealand Māori women
21st-century New Zealand politicians
21st-century New Zealand women politicians
Women members of the New Zealand House of Representatives
Ngāti Hine people
People educated at St Mary's College, Auckland